The 1935 Grand National was the 94th renewal of the Grand National horse race that took place at Aintree near Liverpool, England, on 29 March 1935.

The race was won by Reynoldstown, a 22/1 shot owned and trained by Major Noel Furlong, and ridden by his son, amateur jockey Frank Furlong. Reynoldstown followed up with a second consecutive victory one year later in the 1936 Grand National.

The favourite was Golden Miller who unseated his rider Gerry Wilson on the first circuit.

Finishing order

Non-finishers

References

 1935
Grand National
Grand National
20th century in Lancashire